The Red Bank Stakes is a Listed Stakes American Thoroughbred horse race for horses age three and older contested at a distance of one mile (8 furlongs) on turf held annually at Monmouth Park Racetrack in Oceanport, New Jersey.

History 

An earlier version of the Red Bank Stakes was run between 1882–93. In 1885 as a six-furlong race for two-year-olds. It was won by A. J. Cassatt's, The Bard.

The current rendition was inaugurated in 1974 as a stakes race on dirt for two-year-old fillies, in 1975 it was made open to fillies and mares. In 1980, the race was converted to a handicap event on turf which was open to horses age three and older. 

When conditions are too wet the on discretion has moved the event to the dirt track.

The Red Bank Handicap was run in two divisions in 1984 and 1985.

In 2021 the event was downgraded to a Listed event.

Distance

Since inception the race has been contested at various distances:
 1 mile : 1980 to present
 1 mile and 70 yards on dirt : 1976
  miles on dirt : 1974–1975, 1977–1978 
  miles on turf : 1979

Records
Speed  record: (at current distance of 1 mile)
 1:32.42 – Icy Atlantic (2007) (Stakes and Monmouth Park turf course record)

Most wins:

 3 – Get Serious (2009, 2010, 2012)

Most wins by an owner:

 3 – James Dinan/Phantom House Farm (2009, 2010, 2012)

Most wins by a jockey:
 5 – Joe Bravo (2001, 2003, 2007, 2013, 2016)
 3 – José C. Ferrer (1984, 1989, 1991)
 3 – Pablo Fragoso (2009, 2010, 2012)

Most wins by a trainer:
 5 – Christophe Clement (1993, 1994, 1998, 2013, 2016)
 3 – John Forbes (2009, 2010, 2012)

Winners

Legend:

Notes:

¶ Filly/Mare

† Run in Divisions

References

 Monmouth Park

Open mile category horse races
Graded stakes races in the United States
Horse races in New Jersey
Turf races in the United States
Recurring sporting events established in 1974
Monmouth Park Racetrack
1974 establishments in New Jersey